The Ontario Young Liberals (OYL) is the official youth wing of the Ontario Liberal Party. The OYL's membership includes all members of the Ontario Liberal Party who are students or are aged 25 and under. The organization is divided into campus and riding clubs and led by a 16-member executive board. The OYL is the largest youth political organization in Ontario, and the largest provincial Young Liberal organization in Canada.

Until 2017, the OYL also served as the federal Liberal Party of Canada's youth wing in Ontario. In 2017, the Young Liberals of Canada, the federal party's youth wing, created its own Ontario section, effectively ending the federal Liberal Party's involvement with the OYL.

History

Founded in 1971, the OYL was known as the Ontario New Liberals until the mid-1980s. The organization has consistently proven itself be a training ground for budding politicians and political organizers. Many prominent politicians and staffers are OYL alumni, some of whom have made significant contributions to the organization. These include:

Arnold Chan, Former MP for Scarborough—Agincourt
Steven Del Duca, Leader of the Ontario Liberal Party, former MPP for Vaughan and Ontario Minister of Transportation (served as President of the University of Toronto Liberals)
Yvan Baker, MP and former MPP for Etobicoke Centre
Bonnie Crombie, Mayor of Mississauga and former MP for Mississauga—Streetsville (served on as Student Director of the OYL)
Michael Ignatieff, Former leader of the Liberal Party of Canada
Dwight Duncan, Former MPP for Windsor—Tecumseh and Ontario Finance Minister
Rob Oliphant, MP for Don Valley West (served on the executive of the OYL)
Ruby Dhalla, Former MP for Brampton—Springdale

Influence
Since the Liberal Party allocates specific number of delegate spots for campus liberal associations at its national convention, key players of the OYL wielded unique influence in the party’s leadership selection as it has the largest number of campus associations under its jurisdiction.  OYL had been a fierce battleground during federal leadership races from the early 80s to 2006.  The Paul Martin leadership campaign was particularly notorious for hostile take over of campus liberal associations leading up to the 1990 and 2003 contests.

Structure

The OYL executive is made up of 17 OYL members elected to one-year terms by the membership at the OYL Annual General Meeting. The structure of the Executive consists of a President, Executive Vice-President, Vice-President, Organization, Treasurer, Riding Director, Student Director, Policy Director, Communications Director, Community Engagement Director and 8 Regional Coordinators.

Executive

President: Huzaif Qaisar
Executive Vice-President: Umaid Zahid
Vice-President, Organization: 
Treasurer:  Aqsa Naveed
Communications Director: Carter Brownlee
Policy Director: Rachel Campbell
Riding Director: Sean Mitchell
Student Director: Aidan Meffe
Community Engagement Director: Robert Zhu
Northern Regional Coordinator: Nathan Gravelle
Eastern Regional Coordinator: Nirmit Shah
Ottawa Regional Coordinator: Fatema Abdalla
Golden Horseshoe Regional Coordinator Aiman Akmal
GTA Central Regional Coordinator: Noor Samiei
GTA East Regional Coordinator: Momina Malik
GTA North Regional Coordinator: Cynthia Antony
Southwest Regional Coordinator: Josh Monk

Regions

The OYL recognizes eight distinct regions of the province. Each region is represented by a Regional Coordinator. Each region is further broken down by areas, although these area divisions are seldom used. The eight regions are: Northern Region, Eastern Region, Ottawa Region, Golden Horseshoe Region, GTA Central region, GTA East Region, GTA North Region, and Southwest Region.

Affiliated clubs

The OYL is composed of riding and student clubs. Riding clubs are based in each provincial electoral district. Student clubs are located at universities and colleges in Ontario.

Each club has a constitution, which must agree with the constitutions of the Ontario Liberal Party and the OYL. Each club has an executive, and conducts activities such as community outreach, social events, policy meetings and assists in campaigns during federal or provincial elections.

OYL Annual General Meeting

The executive of the OYL is elected to a one-year term at the Annual General Meeting of the OYL. The AGM is never held in the same region twice in a row.

OYL Summer Fling

In the summer of 2002, the OYL created a new signature event called Summer Fling, which was held at Wilfrid Laurier University the inaugural year. OYL Summer Fling includes a volunteer appreciation dinner, the annual policy conference and many guest speakers. It has quickly become the flagship event of the OYL.

Summer Fling locations

References

External links
 Ontario Young Liberals
 Young Liberals of Canada

Liberals, Ontario Young
Youth wings of liberal parties